Martina Navratilova defeated Kathy Jordan in the final, 6–2, 7–6(7–5) to win the women's singles tennis title at the 1983 Australian Open. It was her second Australian Open singles title and eighth major singles title overall. With the win, she improved her season record to 86 wins and 1 loss.

Chris Evert was the reigning champion, but withdrew before the start of the tournament due to a foot injury.

This tournament was the first Australian Open in which Steffi Graf appeared in the main draw. It also marked the last major appearance of Billie Jean King.

Prize money
The total prize money for the women's singles event was $342,000.

Seeds
The seeded players are listed below. Martina Navratilova is the champion; others show the round in which they were eliminated.

  Martina Navratilova (champion)
  Sylvia Hanika (quarterfinals)
  Pam Shriver (semifinals)
  Wendy Turnbull (quarterfinals)
  Hana Mandlíková (second round)
  Zina Garrison (semifinals)
  Billie Jean King (second round)
  Jo Durie (quarterfinals)
  Kathy Jordan (finalist)
  Kathy Rinaldi (first round)
  Eva Pfaff (third round)
  Carling Bassett (quarterfinals)
  Claudia Kohde-Kilsch (third round)
  Barbara Potter (third round)
  Helena Suková (third round)
  Rosalyn Fairbank (third round)

Qualifying

Draw

Key
 Q = Qualifier
 WC = Wild card
 LL = Lucky loser
 r = Retired

Finals

Earlier rounds

Section 1

Section 2

Section 3

Section 4

References

External links
 1983 Australian Open – Women's draws and results at the International Tennis Federation

Women's singles
Australian Open (tennis) by year – Women's singles
1983 in Australian women's sport
1983 Virginia Slims World Championship Series